Pass the Plate is a multicultural short-form series filmed in ten countries that was produced by Riverstreet Productions in association with Disney Channel. Hosted by The Suite Life of Zack and Cody Brenda Song, the first two seasons of the series included various other Disney Channel performers from all around the world. Season 3, which debuted on November 1, 2013, was co-hosted by Jessie Peyton List and Karan Brar. The fourth season, also hosted by List and Brar, premiered in its entirety on November 8, 2014.

Summary
Rotating on-air each day, Pass the Plate "aims to inspire kids and preteens to lead a healthier lifestyle by sharing cultural and historical facts about food and cooking, while giving emphasis to kids assisting in the preparation of their own meal." Each of the segments focuses on the exposition, preparation and health benefits of one food item – mangoes, rice, fish, tomatoes, bananas, grains, vegetables, fruits, and spinach – and takes viewers across the globe on a tour of how these foods are enjoyed by kids and families in each country.

Production
"We want our programming to reflect and recognize that everyone shares a responsibility to encourage kids and families to adopt healthy lifestyles. Our ongoing healthy kids initiatives...and especially Pass the Plate...represent our global team's effort to both inform and empower our viewers, showing them how kids just like them around the world enjoy and benefit from healthy foods", Disney Channel's Worldwide President Rich Ross said in a statement.

Culinary educator David Glickman is a consultant to the Pass the Plate series.

Host

Original
 Brenda Song (seasons 1–2)
 Peyton List (seasons 3–4)
 Karan Brar (seasons 3–4)

International

 Disney Channel Australia
 Alicia Banit
 Deniz Akdeniz
 Jack Pearson

 Disney Channel Brazil
 Robson Nunes
 Michelli Machado
 Olavo Cavalheiro
 Renata Ferreira

 Dragon Club (China)
 Chi Shuai
 Lu Yun

 Disney Channel France
 Come Levin
 Manon Azem
 Julien Crampon
 Léa Fomzaw

 Disney Channel India
 Sonia Malhotra
 Sunny Malhotra

 Disney Channel Italy
 Giulio Rubinelli
 Ambra Lo Faro

 Disney Channel Japan
 bless4
 Marika Fukunaga

 Disney Channel Latin America
 Daniel Martins
 Federico Di Iorio

 Disney Channel Mexico
 David Holguin Garcia
 Paulina Holguin Garcia

 Disney Channel Spain
 Andreas Muñoz
 Disney Channel South Africa
 Isha
 Rondell

 Disney Channel Singapore
 Renjie

 Disney Channel UK
 Brad Kavanagh
 Gregg Sulkin
 Sydney White

 Disney Channel Vietnam
 Vy Nguyen

List of dishes
Below is a list of dishes featured during the first and second seasons of Pass the Plate hosted by Brenda Song, with Wikilinks where appropriate.

Season 1
Rice Episode
Congee (China)
Mallige Idli (India)
Rice Salad (Italy)
Onigiri (Japan)
California roll (US)

Mangoes Episode
Spinach, Mango and Chicken Salad (US)
Sliced Mango on a Stick (Mexico)
Mango Lassi (India)
Fruity Icy Pole (Australia)
Beef and Mango Stir-Fry (China)

Bananas Episode
Grilled Bananas (set at Big Banana in Coffs Harbour) (Australia)
Banana Smoothies (UK)
Durban Curried Banana Salad (South Africa)
Arroz com Feijao E Banana (Brazil)

Spinach Episode
Poached Eggs with Spinach (Australia)
Spinach Salad with Citrus Fruits (France)
Goma-ae/Bento Boxes (Japan)
Creamy Spinach Soup (UK)
Baked Spinach Balls (US)

Tomatoes Episode
Caprese salad (Italy)
Frikadels (South Africa)
Tomato Farcies (France)
Tomates Rellenos (Argentina)
Marinara Sauce (US)

Fish Episode
Chirashizushi with shredded nori (Japan)
Poisson en Papillote (France)
Spaghetti al Cartoccio (Italy)
Boiled Prawns (UK)

Season 2
Fruit Episode
Fruit salad (Brazil)
Orange with pomegranate/Pomegranate juice (Spain / US)

Vegetable Episode
Rice paper rolls (Vietnam)
Ratatouille (France)

Grain Episode
Various pastas (Italy)
Mee (Singapore)

Second Fish Episode
Traditional Japanese fish markets / Porgy fish with miso broth (Japan)
Cod fish and chips (UK)

Episodes

Season 1 (2007–08)
 Episode 1: "Rice"
 Episode 2: "Banana"
 Episode 3: "Mango"
 Episode 4: "Fish"
 Episode 5: "Spinach"
 Episode 6: "Tomato"

Season 2 (2008)
 Episode 7: "Fruit"
 Episode 8: "Vegetables"
 Episode 9: "Grains"
 Episode 10: "Fish 2"

Season 3 (2013)
 Episode 11: "Cheesemaking"
 Episode 12: "Urban Farming"
 Episode 13: "Gluten-free Grains"
 Episode 14: "Urban Beekeeping"
 Episode 15: "Aquaponics"
 Episode 16: "Slide Ranch"

Season 4 (2014)
 Episode 17: "Greenhouse on Wheels"
 Episode 18: "Rooftop Farming"
 Episode 19: "Shellfish Farming"
 Episode 20: "Popcorn Farming"
 Episode 21: "Pickling"

Worldwide shows

United Kingdom
The show aired on Disney Channel UK in November 2011. Hosted by Gregg Sulkin, Brad Kavanagh, Sydney White, and Amy Wren, it visited the world to find out about what they eat, like China for noodles, or India for curry. There were also tips on healthy eating.

Merchandise
Disney Consumer Products in the United Kingdom announced a deal with Tesco in 2007 to launch a line of branded food products featuring Disney characters. All the items would conform to nutritional guidelines and limits.

References

External links
 

2007 American television series debuts
2014 American television series endings
2000s American children's television series
2010s American children's television series
2000s American cooking television series
2010s American cooking television series
American children's education television series
Disney Channel original programming
English-language television shows
Television series by Disney